The March 711 was a Formula One racing car, designed by Robin Herd and Geoff Ferris, for the  season, and saw continued use throughout the  season.

History
For its first Grand Prix, in 1971, the March 711 was entered by the official March Engineering team with Ronnie Peterson, Andrea de Adamich, Alex Soler-Roig, Niki Lauda, and Nanni Galli. During this season, Peterson finished second four times in Monaco, Great Britain, Italy, and Canada. The best qualification of the season was a fifth place for Peterson in Great Britain. Peterson finished second in the Drivers' World Championship behind Jackie Stewart and ahead of François Cevert. On the constructors' side, the team finished fourth, behind Scuderia Ferrari and ahead of Team Lotus.

During this season, Frank Williams entered a March 711 for Henri Pescarolo. His best qualification was the tenth place in Germany and Italy and his best result a fourth place in Great Britain. Skip Barber was also entering a few Grands Prix with Gene Mason Racing. His best qualification was the twenty-fourth place in the Netherlands and Canada. However, he did not manage to finish any races. Finally, Mike Beuttler joined Clarke-Mordaunt-Guthrie Racing; his best qualification was sixteenth place in Italy, but he did not finish any race.

In 1972, the March 711 was entered full-time only by Team Williams Motul with Carlos Pace. His best qualification was the eleventh place in Belgium, France, and Germany. The best result obtained was the fifth place in Belgium which allowed him to score 3 points and to rank eighteenth in the world championship ahead of Tim Schenken and behind Andrea de Adamich. Speed International gave a chassis to Ray Allen at the British Grand Prix but the car was unavailable. Finally, Skip Barber drove for Gene Mason Racing in the United States and Canadian Grand Prix. His best weekend was that of Canada, with a qualification in the twentieth position and a sixteenth place in the race.

References 

March Formula One cars